The Legend of Jesse James is an American Western television series starring Christopher Jones in the title role of notorious outlaw Jesse James. Produced by Don Siegel, it aired on ABC from September 13, 1965, to May 9, 1966.

Merchandising

The TV series was adapted into a comic strip by Dan Spiegle, distributed by Gold Key Comics.

References

External links 
 

1965 American television series debuts
1966 American television series endings
American Broadcasting Company original programming
Black-and-white American television shows
English-language television shows
Cultural depictions of Jesse James
Television series set in the 19th century
Television series by 20th Century Fox Television
Television shows set in Missouri
1960s Western (genre) television series
Biographical films about Jesse James
Television shows adapted into comics